Vice Admiral of Chile was the title given to the Commander-in-Chief of the Chilean Navy. One of the first Vice Admirals was Thomas Cochrane, 10th Earl of Dundonald, who served under Chile's leader Bernardo O'Higgins.

Chilean Navy